William Cattell may refer to:
 William Cassady Cattell, Presbyterian divine and educator
 William Ashburner Cattell, American civil engineer